The  Atlanta Falcons season was the team's 27th season in the National Football League (NFL). Atlanta played its first season in the Georgia Dome, after having played their first 26 seasons at Fulton County Stadium. The Falcons were unable to match their previous season's output of 10–6 and failed to reach the playoffs. One highlight from this season includes Green Bay Packers quarterback Brett Favre's first return to Atlanta in Week 5 for the first time since being traded from the Falcons during the offseason.

Atlanta was statistically one of the worst defenses in the NFL in 1992. They were the league's worst team in points allowed (414), total yards allowed (5,549), yards per play (5.9), rushing yards allowed (2,294), and yards per rushing attempt (4.9).

Offseason

NFL draft

Personnel

Staff

Roster

Regular season

Schedule

Standings

References

External links
 1992 Atlanta Falcons at Pro-Football-Reference.com

Atlanta Falcons seasons
Atlanta
Atlanta